Paralacydes bomfordi is a moth of the  family Erebidae. It was described by Pinhey in 1968. It is found in South Africa and Zimbabwe.

References

Spilosomina
Moths described in 1968